Mercy Margaret is a poet, short story writer and a social worker from Hyderabad, India. She came to light as a poet through her poems published in Facebook and became famous after receipt of Kendra Sahitya Akademi Yuva Puraskar Award in the year 2017, for her first poetry book "Matala Madugu" "మాటల మడుగు" in Telugu language

Personal life
Her grandfather fought against Razakars and later joined Indian Military. Her father worked as a Duftry in Andhra Bank. Mercy was born, brought up and studied M.Com., M.B.A., in Hyderabad. She grew in Ranga Nagar, Bholakpur, a slum area in Hyderabad. She had Telugu as a medium of instruction in  her school. Started writing poetry at Second Intermediate, though she is not clear of what she wrote. Throughout her education, she earned prizes in debate and essay writing at the level of District and State. She won Second Prize in the essay competition conducted by Visalandhra Publications at state level, while she was undergoing Second year of Degree course. She was awarded books worth ₹.3000/-. Viswambhara and Mahaprasthanam written by C. Narayana Reddy and Sri Sri respectively, were among the prize books, which kindled her interest, in poetry, further. Her poetry was published in several magazines such as Andhrajyothy, Andhra Prabha, Sakshi, Kavita, Sahiti Prasthanam and in Souvenirs like  NATA, ATA. Poetry compilations like Kavita -2013, Kavisangamam etc. published her poems. Many online magazines also published her poetry. In 2018, she contested as an independent MLA candidate from Musheerabad constituency for Telangana elections and lost the contest.

Career
Professional Experience:
Worked in Citi Bank as process associate from 2007 January to August after which she has Worked as an Asst professor at Sri Indu College of Engineering and Technology from 2010 July to 2012 May. Worked as an Asst professor in Holy Mary Business Management College at Keesara from 2012 July to 2014 May and Worked as an Asst professor at Bharat PG college for Women from 2015 August  to 2018 November.

Drama writings 

 Asamarthudu
 Thripura Shapatham

Awards and achievements
She won the first prize in the state level poetry competition conducted by Andhra Pradesh AIDS Control Society. She also won the monthly award for poetry from Sahiti Prasthanam. Received Penna Sahitya Puraskar in the year 2015. She was awarded "Kendra Sahitya Akademi Yuva Puraskar" in 2017  for her Poetry anthology  Maatala Madugu “మాటల మడుగు”.

Bibliography
Poetry - Compilation of Poems 
Matala Madugu మాటల మడుగు (2015) 
Kalam Valipotunna vaipu కాలం వాలిపోతున్న వైపు (2019)
Dear Zindagi డియర్ జిందగీ (2022) 

(2022)

Short stories
Sunnaalu      సున్నాలు             Published in Kotta Katha 2017    
Mattayi 5:11 మత్తయి 5:11       Published in Kotta Katha 2019  
" చీకటిదే మతం " "What religion is Darkness" Published in Saranga web magazine"              
సహజ " " Natural" This story won the Best Story award, in the category of New Story writers from Vanguri foundation of USA.

References

Telugu writers
1983 births
Living people
Recipients of the Sahitya Akademi Yuva Puraskar